The 2012 Green Bay Blizzard season was the team's tenth season as a football franchise and third in the Indoor Football League. One of just nine teams competing in the IFL for the 2012 season, the Green Bay Blizzard were members of the United Conference.The team played their home games at the Resch Center in the Green Bay suburb of Ashwaubenon, Wisconsin.

Schedule
Key:

Roster

Standings

References

External links
Green Bay Blizzard official website
Green Bay Blizzard official statistics

Green Bay Blizzard seasons
Green Bay Blizzard
Green Bay Blizzard